"Bend It Until It Breaks" is a song co-written and recorded by American country music artist John Anderson. It was released in November 1994 as the second single from his album Country 'til I Die. The song reached number 3 on the U.S. Billboard Hot Country Singles & Tracks chart and number 28 on the Canadian RPM Country Tracks chart.  Anderson wrote the song with Lionel Delmore. It is the last Top 10 hit for Anderson to date.

Critical reception
Deborah Evans Price of Billboard magazine gave the song a positive review, saying that Anderson uses "his own sharp songwriting pen and a fiddle hook reminiscent of 'Seminole Wind.'"

Chart performance
"Bend It Until It Breaks" debuted at number 72 on the U.S. Billboard Hot Country Singles & Tracks for the week of December 10, 1994.

Year-end charts

References

1994 singles
1994 songs
John Anderson (musician) songs
Songs written by John Anderson (musician)
Songs written by Lionel Delmore
Song recordings produced by James Stroud
BNA Records singles